The Bishop of Ballarat is the diocesan bishop of the Anglican Diocese of Ballarat, Australia.

List of bishops
References

External links

 – official site

 
Lists of Anglican bishops and archbishops
Anglican bishops of Ballarat